Sphaerodactylus gaigeae, also known commonly as the chevronated sphaero or Gaige's least gecko, is a species of lizard in the family Sphaerodactylidae . The species is endemic to Puerto Rico.

Etymology
The specific name, gaigeae, is in honor of American herpetologist Helen Beulah Thompson Gaige.

Habitat

Description

Reproduction
S. gaigeae is oviparous.

References

Further reading
Grant C (1932). "A new sphaerodactyl from Porto Rico". Journal of Agriculture of the University of Puerto Rico 16 (1): 31. (Sphaerodactylus gaigeae, new species).
Rösler H (2000). "Kommentierte Liste der rezent, subrezent und fossil bekannten Geckotaxa (Reptilia: Gekkonomorpha) ". Gekkota 2: 28–153. (Sphaerodactylus gaigeae, p. 112). (in German).
Schwartz A, Henderson RW (1991). Amphibians and Reptiles of the West Indies: Descriptions, Distributions, and Natural History. Gainesville, Florida: University of Florida Press. 720 pp. . (Sphaerodactylus gaigeae, p. 496).
Schwartz A, Thomas R (1975). A Check-list of West Indian Amphibians and Reptiles. Carnegie Museum of Natural History Special Publication No. 1. Pittsburgh, Pennsylvania: Carnegie Museum of Natural History. 216 pp. (Sphaerodactylus gaigeae, p. 152).
Thomas R, Schwartz A (1966). "Sphaerodactylus (Gekkonidae) in the Greater Puerto Rico Region". Bulletin of the Florida State Museum 10 (6): 193–260. (Sphaerodactylus gaigeae, pp. 240–242).

Sphaerodactylus
Reptiles of Puerto Rico
Endemic fauna of Puerto Rico
Reptiles described in 1932
Taxa named by Chapman Grant